Sandro Aminashvili (born February 21, 1992) is a Georgian freestyle wrestler. He competed in the men's freestyle 86 kg event at the 2016 Summer Olympics, in which he was eliminated in the round of 16 by Zbigniew Baranowski. 2015 World Wrestling Championships bronze medalist. At the 2018 European Wrestling Championships, Aminashvili won bronze medal in men's freestyle 86 kg event. In March 2021, he competed at the European Qualification Tournament in Budapest, Hungary hoping to qualify for the 2020 Summer Olympics in Tokyo, Japan.

References

External links 
 

1992 births
Living people
Sportspeople from Tbilisi
Male sport wrestlers from Georgia (country)
Olympic wrestlers of Georgia (country)
Wrestlers at the 2016 Summer Olympics
Wrestlers at the 2015 European Games
Wrestlers at the 2019 European Games
European Games competitors for Georgia (country)